The Original Six are the teams that comprised the National Hockey League (NHL) between 1942 and 1967. The six teams are the Boston Bruins, Chicago Black Hawks, Detroit Red Wings, Montreal Canadiens, New York Rangers, and Toronto Maple Leafs. After serving as the league's only teams for 25 seasons, they were joined by six new franchises in the 1967 NHL expansion.

Contrary to the name, the Canadiens and Maple Leafs are the only charter members of the NHL. Despite this, the six are considered a traditional set for joining the league by 1926 and being the NHL's oldest active franchises. 

The Original Six have the most combined Stanley Cup titles among NHL franchises; the Canadiens hold the most wins at 24. The Maple Leafs, who won the last Stanley Cup of the Original Six era, are the only Original Six franchise to have not returned to the Stanley Cup since the 1967 expansion.

Teams

Background

The NHL consisted of ten teams during the 1920s, but the league experienced a period of retrenchment during the Great Depression, losing the Pittsburgh Pirates/Philadelphia Quakers, Ottawa Senators/St. Louis Eagles, and Montreal Maroons in succession to financial pressures. The New York/Brooklyn Americans, one of the league's original expansion franchises, along with the Bruins and Maroons, lasted longer but played as wards of the league from 1936 onward. World War II and its own economic strains severely depleted the league's Canadian player base since Canada entered the war in September 1939, and many players left for military service. The Americans suspended operations in the fall of 1942, which left the NHL with just six teams.

Despite various outside efforts to initiate expansion after the war, including attempted revivals of the Maroons and Americans franchises, the league's membership would remain at six teams for the next 25 seasons.

Criticisms
The Original Six era has been criticized for having a playoff system that was too easy since the top four teams in the regular season advanced to the playoffs. At least, the playoff system was too easy for the top three teams in the league: Montreal, Toronto, and Detroit. The standings were very static. Montreal missed the playoffs only once between 1943 and 1967 (in 1948), and Toronto missed the post-season four times and Detroit missed three times, which left the three remaining teams to compete for the final playoff berth. Montreal won ten of the 25 Stanley Cups awarded during the Original Six era, Toronto won nine, and Detroit won five. Chicago won only one Stanley Cup during that era (in 1961), and Boston and New York won no Cups.

It was not a coincidence that two of the dominant teams were based in Canada, and the third was based in an American city that borders Canada. The league had a rule that gave each team exclusive rights to negotiate contracts with promising local players within  of its home ice. A player who was not within the 50-mile limit was free to field offers from any team. Once a player agreed to an NHL sponsorship-level contract, the NHL club could assign him to its sponsored junior squad, its "sponsorship list."

Since the Toronto and the Montreal metropolitan areas contained abundant hockey prospects, that put them at a major recruiting advantage over Boston, New York, and Chicago, which had very few such prospects in their territories. Detroit had Southwestern Ontario as part of its territory and so it did not have the major advantage of the Canadian teams, but it was better positioned than the other American ones.

In practice, all six teams recruited players from Canada by sponsoring minor league, junior, and amateur teams. As a result, the league was almost entirely composed of Canadians, who had come up through the junior and minor pro leagues. The league boasted a small amount of good American players during the 1940s including the All-Star goalkeepers Frank Brimsek and Mike Karakas, defenseman John Mariucci, and forward Cully Dahlstrom. At the beginning of the Original Six era, the Chicago Black Hawks were owned by Major Frederic McLaughlin, a fiercely-patriotic man who tried to stock his roster with as many American players as possible. However, he died in 1944, and his estate sold the team to a group controlled by the Norris family, which also owned the Red Wings. After that time, the Black Hawks had only a few American-born players, just like the other American-based teams. The Canadian teams had very few. The only American-born Maple Leaf during the entire era was Gerry Foley who was born in Ware, Massachusetts, but grew up in Garson, Ontario, and played just four games for Toronto although he played two full seasons for the New York Rangers. The Canadiens' only American-born skater was Norm Dussault, a forward who was born in Springfield, Massachusetts, but grew up in Sherbrooke, Quebec. An American goalie, John Aiken, also played exactly half a game for the Habs on March 13, 1958; he was a Boston Bruins team employee who filled in for his team's opponent as an emergency replacement when Jacques Plante was injured during the second period of a game at the Boston Garden. The family of the Detroit-born Charlie Burns moved to Toronto when he was a child; he was a four-year regular with Detroit and Boston from 1958 to 1963.

Very few all American-developed NHL players emerged in the 1950s and 1960s. Tommy Williams was the only American citizen to play regularly. Both Williams and Mariucci complained about anti-American bias, and U.S. Olympic team stars John Mayasich and Bill Cleary turned down offers from NHL teams. Although there were several European-born players (such as the Slovakian-born Hall of Famer Stan Mikita), who immigrated to Canada as children, the only European-born and trained player of the era was Sweden's Ulf Sterner, who briefly played for the Rangers in 1965. The league's first black player, Willie O'Ree, came up during that era; he played for the Boston Bruins between 1958 and 1961 but turned out to be the only black player until the 1970s.

After World War II, all six NHL owners consistently rejected any bids for expansion. In the eyes of many observers, the criteria for entry were changed every time with a desire to defeat any such bid. The owners also reneged on promises to allow the extant but dormant Maroons and Americans franchises to reactivate.

Those phenomena had the impact of limiting player movement, and as a result, the Original Six rosters were very static. Until the lengthening of careers in the 1980s, only one 20-year player in NHL history, Larry Robinson, started his career after 1964, and it is generally accepted that the weakest Calder Trophy winners (Rookies of the Year) of all time were selected in the 1950s and the 1960s.

Corruption
The league tolerated monopolistic practices by the owners. At one point, for instance, Red Wings owner James E. Norris effectively owned the Black Hawks as well and was also the largest stockholder in the Rangers. He also had significant influence over the Bruins by way of mortgages extended to the team to help keep it afloat during the Depression, which led some critics to joke that NHL stood for "Norris House League."

The control of owners over their teams was absolute. Players who got on the wrong side of their team owner were often harshly punished by being either traded out of town or sent to the minors. An example of this is the case of the bruising Red Wings forward Ted Lindsay, who, after agitating for a players' union, was sent to the last-place Black Hawks. Norris' conglomerate did not invest in Boston, Chicago, and New York, which mostly just filled dates for the Norris arenas. A measure of the dominance of Detroit, Montreal, and Toronto in the era can be seen in that between the Bruins' Stanley Cup wins in 1941 and 1970, every single Cup except for Chicago in 1961 was won by the Red Wings, the Canadiens, or the Maple Leafs, and those three teams failed to make the playoffs only eight times combined in the era.

Labour conditions for the players were also poor. Players' medical bills were paid for only two months after an injury. Moreover, whenever players were sent to the minors, they had their salaries cut, and their relocation costs were not covered. The players were also not paid for off-season promotions and did not share in the funds of promotions such as trading cards as was done in baseball. In the earlier era, players were allowed to play other sports, such as lacrosse, for money in the off-season, but that was disallowed in the standard Original Six-era contract. Players were signed as early as 16, and they were bound to one of the teams, which then directed their development.

The pension plan, formed in 1946, was ostensibly for the players' benefit but was kept secret, which hid large amounts of money under the control of the owners. The pension plan was exposed only in 1989, when it was found that a $25 million surplus existed. The stark labor conditions led to several players' disputes, including a 1957 antitrust action and attempted union formation, as well as subsequent actions in the early 1960s by the Toronto players Bob Baun and Carl Brewer, which led to the 1967 formation of the NHL Players Association.

End of era

As the more conservative owners left the NHL, a younger guard that was more receptive to expansion came into the league. By 1963, when the Rangers governor, William M. Jennings, first introduced to his peers the idea of expanding the NHL, Major League Baseball and the National Football League were adding teams, and the American Football League was becoming an attractive alternative to the NFL. Jennings proposed for the NHL to add two new teams on the American West Coast for the 1964–65 season and based his argument on concerns that the Western Hockey League intended to operate as a major league in the near future and possibly to compete against the NHL for talent. He also hoped that a West Coast presence would make the NHL truly national and improve the league's chances of returning to national television in the United States (its broadcast deal with CBS had expired in 1960). While the governors did not agree to Jennings' proposal, the topic of expansion arose every time that the owners met from then on. In 1965, the league decided to double in size by adding six teams, and in February 1966, expansion franchises were awarded to Los Angeles, Minnesota, Philadelphia, Pittsburgh, St. Louis, and the San Francisco-Oakland area. The six new clubs would begin play in the 1967–68 season. Thus, with Toronto's six-game victory over Montreal in the 1967 Stanley Cup Finals, the Original Six era came to a close.

The first dozen seasons (1967–68 to 1978–79) of the Expansion Era saw the continued dominance by Original Six teams, including the Bobby Orr-led Bruins in the early 1970s and the Canadiens' dynasty at the end of that decade. The expansion teams, by comparison, were not as dominant during that same time period. During those dozen seasons, only one expansion team hoisted the Cup (the Philadelphia Flyers, in 1974 and 1975), and only one Stanley Cup Finals series featured two expansion teams (the Flyers' 1975 win over the Buffalo Sabres). By the early 1980s, after further expansion, a merger with the WHA, and changes in conference/division alignment and playoff structure, expansion teams began reaching clear parity with the Original Six. Indeed, the 1979 Stanley Cup Finals between the Canadiens and Rangers would be the last Final featuring any Original Six team until 1986, when the Canadiens claimed the Cup, as well as the last all-Original Six Final until Chicago's win over Boston in 2013 (that playoff season featured all of the Original Six teams for the first time since 1996).

With the exception of Toronto, since the dawn of the Expansion Era every Original Six team has played in the Stanley Cup Finals at least 4 times and won the Cup at least once (the Maple Leafs have not competed in a Final since winning in 1967, the longest active NHL championship drought). The Montreal Canadiens have twice won the Cup by defeating other Original Six clubs in every series the playoffs: in 1978 (beating Detroit, Toronto, and Boston) and 1979 (beating Toronto, Boston, and New York). Also, the 1992 Pittsburgh Penguins are the only team to also win the Cup after beating three of the Original Six (New York and Boston in the Wales Conference playoffs, and Chicago in the finals). Twice, the Eastern Conference champion beat two Original Six teams before being defeated by another in the Stanley Cup Final: the 2002 Carolina Hurricanes (beat Montreal and Toronto, lost to Detroit) and 2010 Philadelphia Flyers (beat Boston and Montreal, lost to Chicago). In 2013, the League moved the Red Wings to the Eastern Conference, leaving Chicago as the only Original Six team in the West. In 2015, the Tampa Bay Lightning became the first team to face only Original Six franchises in the four-round playoff era, beating Detroit, Montreal, and New York in the Eastern playoffs before falling in the finals to Chicago.

The last active player from the Original Six era was Wayne Cashman, who retired with the Boston Bruins in 1983. The final active player and official in any on-ice capacity for the league was linesman John D'Amico, who retired at the end of the 1986-87 season.

According to Forbes in 2015, five of the Original Six teams are the top five most valuable NHL clubs: the Rangers at approximately $1.2 billion, the Canadiens at $1.18 billion, the Maple Leafs at $1.15 billion, the Blackhawks at $925 million, and the Bruins at $750 million. The Red Wings rank eighth at $600 million.

Head-to-head records
Records current .

See also
 History of the National Hockey League
 History of the National Hockey League (1942–1967)
 List of Stanley Cup playoffs broadcasters (Original Six era)

References

Further reading

External links
 How the Original Six Got Their Names
 Boston Bruins head-to-head records
 Chicago Blackhawks head-to-head records
 Detroit Red Wings head-to-head records
 Montreal Canadiens head-to-head records
 New York Rangers head-to-head records
 Toronto Maple Leafs head-to-head records

History of the Boston Bruins
History of the Chicago Blackhawks
History of the Detroit Red Wings
National Hockey League history
Ice hockey terminology
History of the Montreal Canadiens
History of the New York Rangers
History of the Toronto Maple Leafs
1940s in sports
1950s in sports
1960s in sports